Robert Antonio Servín (born 18 July 1984 in Cecilio Báez) is a Paraguayan footballer playing for Comerciantes Unidos.

External links
 
 

1984 births
Living people
Paraguayan footballers
Paraguayan expatriate footballers
Association football defenders
Sportivo Luqueño players
Cerro Porteño players
FC Sion players
Everton de Viña del Mar footballers
Coquimbo Unido footballers
Chilean Primera División players
Expatriate footballers in Chile
Expatriate footballers in Switzerland